Jameh Mosque of Radkan is related to the late Timurid Empire - Safavid dynasty, and is located in the city of Chenaran County, central part of Radkan village.

Sources 

Mosques in Iran
Mosque buildings with domes
National works of Iran
Radkan